Starbuck Glacier is a glacier 15 nautical miles (28 km) long, flowing east along the south side of Taridin Ridge and Padesh Ridge, and entering Scar Inlet immediately north of Mount Queequeg, on the east coast of Graham Land. Surveyed and partially photographed by the Falkland Islands Dependencies Survey (FIDS) in 1947. The entire glacier was photographed by the Falkland Islands and Dependencies Aerial Survey Expedition (FIDASE) in 1955–56, and mapped from these photos by the FIDS in 1957. Named by the United Kingdom Antarctic Place-Names Committee (UK-APC) after the first mate on the Pequod in Herman Melville's Moby-Dick.

Further reading 
 Farinotti, D., King, E., Albrecht, A., Huss, M., & Gudmundsson, G. (2014), The bedrock topography of Starbuck Glacier, Antarctic Peninsula, as determined by radio-echo soundings and flow modeling,  Annals of Glaciology, 55(67), 22-28. doi:10.3189/2014AoG67A025
 Kristaps Lamsters, Janis Karu, Agnis Recs, Davids Berzins, Detailed subglacial topography and drumlins at the marginal zone of Múlajokull outlet glacier, central Iceland: Evidence from low frequency GPR data,  Department of Geography and Earth Sciences, University of Latvia, Rainis Boulevard 19, LV-1586, Rıga, Latvia
 Scambos, T.A. and Berthier, E. and Haran, T. and Shuman, C.A. and Cook, A.J. and Ligtenberg, S. and Bohlander, J. (2014), Detailed ice loss pattern in the northern Antarctic Peninsula : widespread decline driven by ice front retreats,  The cryosphere., 8 (6). pp. 2135-2145 https://doi.org/10.5194/tc-8-2135-2014 
 ANDREW FREEDMAN, Scientists find large Antarctic ice shelves closer to collapse than they thought,  MAY 19, 2015

See also 
Whitewhale Bastion

References

External links 
 Starbuck Glacier on USGS website
 Starbuck Glacier on AADC website
 Starbuck Glacier on SCAR website

Glaciers of Oscar II Coast